Hebius frenatus the bridled keelback, is a species of snake of the family Colubridae. The snake is found in Indonesia and Malaysia.

References 

frenatus
Reptiles of Indonesia
Reptiles of Malaysia
Reptiles described in 1923
Taxa named by Emmett Reid Dunn
Reptiles of Borneo